Miss Angola is a national beauty pageant in Angola. The pageant was founded in 1997 where the winners were sent to Miss Universe.

Miss Angola has produced one Miss Universe winner; Leila Lopes of Benguela Province was crowned Miss Universe 2011, becoming the first black African to win Miss Universe since 1999.

History
Miss Angola was first founded in 1997 under the directorship of Ana Paula Lemos dos Santos, as the sole Angolan franchise owner to Miss World and Miss Universe. Within its first decade of competing internationally, Miss Angola had amassed six placements across the two pageants. In 2011, Leila Lopes was crowned Miss Universe 2011, becoming the first Angolan woman to win a major international pageant. In 2022, Lopes acquired the Miss Universe franchise license in Angola.

International crowns 

 Miss Universe
 Leila Lopes (2011)

Titleholders

Wins by province

Titleholders under Comité Miss Angola

Miss Angola Universo

The Miss Angola represents her country at the Miss Universe. On occasion, when the winner does not qualify (due to age) for either contest, a runner-up is sent.

Past titleholders under Comité Miss Angola

Miss Angola Mundo

Since inception, the runners-up of Miss Angola were sent to Miss World. Afterwards, another Organization got the rights to the franchise titled "Miss Angola Mundo" to select their representatives in Miss World.

Miss Angola Internacional

The Miss Angola represented her country at the Miss International 2004 and Telma de Jesus Sonhi was the first and the last Miss Angola who competed in Miss International history. Since 2005 there is no Angolan representative in the pageant.

Gallery of winners

Notes

References 
 

 

Angola, Miss
1997 establishments in Angola
Angola